The Liuwan Museum of Ancient Painted Pottery is a ceramics museum located in Ledu District, Qinghai Province, China. The museum opened in 2004 and has a collection of 37,925 objects, many of which are from the Neolithic period from Liwan tombs. It is the largest painted pottery museum in China.

See also
 List of museums in China

References 

Art museums established in 2004
Archaeological museums in China
Ceramics museums in China
Museums in Qinghai
Decorative arts museums in China
2004 establishments in China